Fra' Ramón Despuig y Martínez de Marcilla (Aragonese: Ramón Despuig i Martínez de Marcilla; ; 1670, Mallorca – 15 January 1741, Malta) was a Spanish knight of Aragon who served as the 67th  Grand Master of the Order of Malta from  1736  until his death. He was succeeded by Manuel Pinto da Fonseca. During his reign, the legislation of the small state was renewed and the Cathedral of St. John in Valletta was reformed. Several vessels of the Algerian Navy were also captured by the Order's galleys during his reign.

Despuig Bastion, which is part of the fortifications of Mdina, was built between 1739 and 1746 and was named after the Grand Master. He died in 1741.

References

External links

 Coins of Grandmaster Raymond Despuig

1670 births
1741 deaths
Knights of Malta
Grand Masters of the Knights Hospitaller
Burials at Saint John's Co-Cathedral